Ann Dow (born May 1, 1971) is a Canadian water polo player. She was part of the fifth place women's water polo team at the 2000 Summer Olympics and was part of the bronze medal-winning women's water polo team at the 2001 World Championships in Fukuoka, Japan.

At club level, she played for Greek powerhouse Olympiacos in 2001–2002 season.

Dow was born in Montreal, Quebec. She is a graduate of the Université du Québec à Montréal.

See also
 Canada women's Olympic water polo team records and statistics
 List of World Aquatics Championships medalists in water polo

References

External links
 

1971 births
Anglophone Quebec people
Canadian female water polo players
Living people
Olympic water polo players of Canada
Water polo players from Montreal
Olympiacos Women's Water Polo Team players
Université du Québec à Montréal alumni
Water polo players at the 2000 Summer Olympics
Water polo players at the 2004 Summer Olympics
World Aquatics Championships medalists in water polo
Pan American Games silver medalists for Canada
Pan American Games medalists in water polo
Water polo players at the 2003 Pan American Games
Medalists at the 2003 Pan American Games